The Cork Islamic Cultural Centre (CICC) is an Irish-registered non-profit organisation established to "invite Muslims back to the teachings of the Quran and Sunnah and to educate Non-Muslims about Islam." It opened in October 2013 in an effort to serve the second largest Muslim community in Ireland. The "mega mosque", as it is often called, was constructed with about €800,000 in donations from Qatar.

Vision and mission 
According to its website, the vision of the Cork Islamic Cultural Centre is to form a "strong community of faith to avoid social phenomena." CCIC also hopes to promote understanding and awareness of the practice and appreciation toward lifestyle that is based on the teaching of Islam. The centre aspires to develop a community based on Islamic faith and morality which focuses on the family and the mosque. They desire to develop the individual toward the welfare of the community and to develop a thoughtful civil society between secular and religious claims.

The CCIC is a place of worship and imparting knowledge. They hope to set an example to other mosques by collecting and organising Islamic knowledge. They hold prayer five times a day, give fair treatment to all applicants who wish to use the facilities and equipment as long as they follow guidelines, and provide religious advice to all of the customers in a timely fashion. The CCIS provides recitation classes for all ages based on a set curriculum and provide services to people at home and abroad.

Al Resala School 
The purpose of the Al Resala School is to provide sound Islamic education to children aged 5–16 to help them to develop a sense of belonging to a community of Muslims. They aim to nurture their students’ personality toward moral conduct, healthy attitudes, self-discipline, responsible citizens, and contributors to the welfare of society and humankind as is taught in the Quran and Sunnah. They also enable students to worship Allah in the manner set by the Quran and Allah’s messengers.

Al Reseala offers classes in the Quran and in Arabic as well as teaching stories from Muhammad and from other prophets. They also hold classes on morals and manners.

The objectives of the school include teaching students the ability to read, write, and understand Arabic terms and phrases as well as Quran recitation. They aspire to instill full understanding of basic Islamic beliefs, and to be able to perform the rituals, etiquette, and morals practiced in Islam.

Imam  
The Imam at CICC is Sheikh Ahmed Hussain Halawa who is an accomplished teacher of Islamic sacred sciences. He holds a B.A. in Islamic Daw’ah from Jami’a Al-Azhar and is originally from Egypt. He was given a licence to teach the Quran in 2007. He is a part time teacher at Dar al-Arqam where he teaches Quran memorisation. He was formerly the Imam for the Islamic Society of Monmouth County, New Jersey, and served as a member of the Imam Council of New York, New Jersey, and Connecticut. He has spoken as the Islamic Society of North America (ISNA), Islamic Relief, and Muslim Students Association (MSA) conferences. He holds a certificate to teach Arabic from Cordoba University.

Controversy 
Several articles have been written that list the Cork Islamic Cultural Centre as an example of one of many properties throughout Europe, paid for by the Qatari government, in an effort to spread an extreme and intolerant form of Islam known as Wahhabism.

In 2013 the centre faced scrutiny over the fact that the initial building, the Cork Dawah Centre, was operating more as a place of worship than an information and cultural centre. The centre was issued a letter of warning by the local city council.

See also
 Islam in the Republic of Ireland

References

2013 establishments in Ireland
Islamic organisations based in Ireland
Religious organizations established in 2013
Islamic organizations established in the 21st century